János Kemény or Kemény János may refer to:

János Kemény (author) (1903–1971), Hungarian writer, theater director and dramatist
John G. Kemeny (1926–1992), Hungarian American mathematician, computer scientist and educator
John Kemeny (film producer) (1925–2012), Hungarian-born film producer
John Kemény (prince) (1607–1662), duke/prince of Transylvania